Aquatic and environmental engineering; an engineering topic, used sometimes as a synonym for Civil engineering by some universities in Sweden, since the word 'civil engineer' often refers to an engineering degree.

Engineering disciplines

Aquatic engineering is where the engineer studies that of oceanography, and aquatic life in the area of fields.